Paundraka Vāsudēva is a king appearing in the Bhagawat Purana. According to it, he was the king of Pundra Kingdom. Some sources state he was an ally of both Jarasandha, the king of Magadha and Shakuni, the king of the Gandhara Kingdom. He was a major enemy of  Krishna. He imitated  Krishna, believing himself to be Vāsudeva, or God. Later he was killed by Krishna in battle. According to some scriptures, Paundraka was Krishna's doppelganger. He is considered to be an incarnation of the demoniac King Vena as per some sources.

Declaration to be God 

Some versions of  Srimad Bhagavatam, states that he was the son of Vāsudēva (Not to be mistaken with that Vasudeva, who was the Father of Shri Krishna bhagwan) and Sutanu, the princess of Kasi. Vāsudeva Krishna, and as a son of Vāsudēva he was named Vāsudeva. He became the king of Kasi, because his grandfather was son-less. Vāsudēva could not enjoy the childhood of Paundraka, being held captive by Kansa Paundraka collected taxes from several kings. He foolishly believed the words of his friends, who said Paundraka was God. During the absence of Balarama in Dwarka (Srimad Bhagavatam, Canto 10, Chapter 65), Paundraka sent a message to  Krishna, stating that the symbols used by the latter belonged to him, such as the flag of Garuda. He declared he was the real Vāsudēva (God) and not Krishna, who is considered the Supreme Personality of Godhead. He ordered Krishna to stop using "his" identity. Then, Krishna waged war against Paundraka and killed him.

Death 
According to the 66th chapter of Canto 10 of Srimad Bhagavatam, when Paundraka sent a message to Dwaraka stating that he was God, Krishna declared war against him. Paundraka's chariot was made similar to Krishna's, even with a flag of Garuda.After giving many warnings to him to leave his false claims of pretending as Vāsudēva, Krishna killed Paundraka by beheading off Paundraka's head with the Sudarshana Chakra. The son of the king of Kashi, Sudakshina, created a demon using black magic to destroy Dwaraka, with the help of some corrupt priests. However, Krishna's Sudarshana Chakra set fire around Kashi. The whole kingdom was burnt and Sudakshina and all his priests were killed.

See also
History of India

References

Further reading
 
 
 
 
 

Rulers of Bengal
Mythological Indian monarchs